Claude Lemaire (21 February 1921 – 5 February 2004) was a French entomologist.
He specialised in Lepidoptera Saturniidae.

Studies
 Graduate Diploma of Civil Law, Faculty of Law of Paris
 Graduate Diploma of Political Economy, Faculty of Law of Paris
 Doctorate in Law 
 Doctorate of the University of Paris (Sciences)

Professional activities
 1949–1956: Bank. Chief of contentious department
 1957–1959: Auctioneer at Drouot (Paris)

Entomological activities

Publications
Lemaire published about 100 entomological works.

Awards
He was elected president of the Société entomologique de France in 1972, president of the Association for Tropical Lepidoptera in 1992, and twice as vice-president of the Lepidopterists' Society.

He received the prizes Constant (1971) and Réaumur (2003) of the Société entomologique de France. In 1999, he received the Karl Jordan Medal of the Lepidopterists' Society.

Genus and species described
In their necrology, Naumann, Brosch and Nässig, gave 319 taxa described by Lemaire directly or in collaboration with other authors.

Genera
Ten genera are attributed to Lemaire:
 Arias Lemaire, 1995
 Automeropsis Lemaire, 1969
 Citheronioides Lemaire, 1988
 Erythromeris Lemaire, 1969
 Gamelioides Lemaire, 1988
 Hyperchirioides Lemaire, 1981
 Hypermerina Lemaire, 1969
 Leucanella Lemaire, 1969
 Mielkesia Lemaire, 1988
 Pseudautomeris Lemaire, 1967

References

1921 births
2004 deaths
French lepidopterists
Presidents of the Société entomologique de France
20th-century French zoologists